Snowslip is an unincorporated community and census-designated place (CDP) in Flathead County, Montana, United States. The community is in the valley of Bear Creek and is surrounded by Flathead National Forest. The BNSF Railway Hi-Line route passes along the northwest side of the valley just outside the CDP. Glacier National Park is to the northwest, across the Hi-Line.

Snowslip was first listed as a CDP prior to the 2020 census.

Demographics

References 

Census-designated places in Flathead County, Montana
Census-designated places in Montana